Helmut Otto Hofer (22 October 1912 in Mährisch Weisskirchen, Moravia - 26 July 1989 in Kassel) was an Austrian zoologist and anatomist.

Hofer received his Doctor of Philosophy degree from the University of Vienna in 1937. From 1938 until 1945 he was at the State Museum of Zoology in Dresden, Germany, although, because of the annexation of Austria by Germany in 1938, his work was interrupted by military service in the German army. From 1949 until 1953, he worked as a research assistant at the Zoological Institute of the University of Vienna, and from 1953 until 1965 he was a researcher at the Max Planck Institute for Brain Research in Giessen and then in Frankfurt am Main. In 1965 he moved to the Delta Regional Primate Research Center (now the Tulane National Primate Research Center) in Covington, Louisiana, USA, where he remained until his retirement in 1977. From then until his death in 1989, he continued his work at the University of Kassel (Germany).

Hofer is known for his contributions to the fields of neuroanatomy, comparative anatomy, paleontology, and primatology, for which he received the Senior Scientist Award from the Alexander von Humboldt Foundation in 1974. He was the founding Secretary General (1964-1972) of the International Primatological Society. In 1958 he introduced the term "circumventricular organs" to describe a group of unusual structures located around the ventricles of the brain.

References

1912 births
1989 deaths
20th-century Austrian zoologists
Austrian anatomists
University of Vienna alumni
Austrian expatriates in the United States
Austrian expatriates in Germany
People from Hranice (Přerov District)
Moravian-German people